Ismail Abdul-Ganiyu (born 12 June 1996) is a Ghanaian professional footballer who plays as defender and captains Ghana Premier League side Asante Kotoko S.C.

He began his career with Wa All Stars and before signing for Karela United in September 2017. He won the Ghana Premier League and Ghana Super Cup with Wa All Stars before joining Karela, then later Asante Kotoko in October 2018. Abdul-Ganiyu made his international debut for Ghana in 2021 against South Africa.

Club career

Wa All Stars 
Abdul-Ganiyu started his career in his hometown Wa with Wa All Stars in 2013. In February 2014, he scored a free-kick against Accra Hearts of Oak as All Stars won by 3–0.  On 18 June 2015, he scored from the spot-kick to help Wa All Stars to a 2–0 victory over Hearts of Oak. In 2016, he formed a formidable defensive partnership with Ishaku Konda and Hafiz Adams as Wa All Stars won the Ghana Premier League in the 2016 season. En route to the title the trio helped the team to secure the title and earn the best defensive record of the season by conceding 22 goals in 30 matches. During the title winning season, he played 26 league matches and scored a goal. On 22 January 2017, he won the Ghana Super Cup as Wa All Stars scored Bechem United via a lone goal by Emmnauel Ocran.

Karela United 
In September 2017, Abdul-Ganiyu signed for newly promoted Ghana Premier League side Karela United. He made his debut for Karela on 17 March 2018, playing the full 90 minutes in a 1–0 loss to regional rivals Medeama. He scored his debut goal by scoring a penalty in a 3–1 victory over his future club Asante Kotoko. Abdul-Ganiyu played 90 minutes in all 15 league matches, scored two goals and won three man of the match awards before the league was cancelled due to the Anas Number 12 Expose.

Asante Kotoko 
In October 2018, Abdul-Ganiyu signed a three-year contract deal for Kumasi Asante Kotoko from Karela United. On 31 March 2019, he made his debut during the 2019 GFA Normalization Competition starting alongside Wahab Adams in defence as Kotoko defeated Aduana Stars by 1–0.  He scored his first goal for Asante Kotoko by scoring a penalty in a 1–0 league win against Eleven Wonders on 5 May 2019. He played  the full  90 minutes in all 14 matches as Kotoko clinched the Normalization Competition. In the championship play-off final, he converted his penalty kick to push Kotoko to a 4–1 penalty shootout after the match had ended in a 1–1 draw. On 22 December 2019, he won his second trophy with the club, after Asante Kotoko defeated their rivals Hearts of Oak by 2–1 victory in the President's Cup. Three years after joining the club, on 7 October 2021, he was named as the new club captain by manager Prosper Narteh Ogum following the departure of Felix Annan and Emmanuel Gyamfi.

International career 
In 2014, Abdul-Ganiyu was a member of the Ghana U-23 team. He was a member of the Black Meteors squad that lost to Nigeria by 1–0 during the official opening of the newly built Akpa Ibom Stadium in Uyo on 7 November 2014.

In May 2016, he was called up to the Ghana A' national team ahead of the  2016 MS&AD Cup against Japan under-23 team. The MS&AD Cup is organized by an international friendly match organized by MS&AD Insurance Group, with the 2016 edition also being used to raise funds for the victims of the 2016 Kumamoto earthquakes. Abdul-Ganiyu started the match, however Ghana was lost by 3–0 to Japan U-23.

In March 2021, Abdul-Ganiyu was handed his first Ghana national team call up by head coach, C. K. Akonnor, for Ghana's final two 2021 African Cup of Nations qualifiers against South Africa and São Tomé and Príncipe. On 25 March 2021, he made his debut for the Black Stars, starting in the AFCON qualifiers against South Africa which ended in a 1–1 draw.

Honours 
Wa All Stars

 Ghana Premier League: 2016
 Ghana Super Cup: 2017

Asante Kotoko

 GFA Normalization Committee Special Competition: 2019

 Ghana Premier League: 2021–22
 President's Cup: 2019

References

External links 

 
 
 

Living people
1996 births
Ghanaian footballers
Association football defenders
Asante Kotoko S.C. players
Ghana Premier League players
Karela United FC players
Legon Cities FC players
Ghana international footballers